The Valea Frumoasă is a left tributary of the river Borumlaca in Romania. It flows into the Borumlaca near Suplacu de Barcău.

References

Rivers of Romania
Rivers of Bihor County